"Colour of Love" is a song recorded by Dutch-German singer Amber. It was released in 1996 as the second single from her debut album of the same name (1996), and is the follow-up to her successful hit, "This Is Your Night". The song is co-written by Amber with Berman Brothers, who also produced it, and charted in several countries, like Australia, Iceland and New Zealand. In the latter, it was a bigger hit than "This is Your Night, peaking at number 31. On the US Billboard Hot 100, the song reached number 105, but later number 74, in 1997. On the Billboard Hot Dance Club Play chart, it peaked at number five. The accompanying music video for "Colour of Love" sees Amber performing in a yellow submarine. 

On June 17, 2022, the Jonathan Peters & Anthony Acid Trenergy Hard Remix, which was never previously issued commercially, was released to all digital platforms internationally as part of the Amber Remixed - Extended Versions long form compilation of club remixes.

Critical reception
Barry Walters for The Advocate viewed the song as a "sugarcoated treat". AllMusic editor Alex Henderson described it as "European-sounding", noting that it's not "unlike something '80s dance duo Fun Fun would have done". Larry Flick from Billboard declared it as an "solid", "engaging", "infectious and perky Euro-NRG twirler", adding that "her performance is nothing short of star-powered." Jeffrey Lee Puckett from The Courier-Journal felt that the song "ups the dance quotient", "but it also boasts a pure-pop hook." L.A. Times noted Amber's "giddy exuberance". A reviewer from Music Week wrote, "What promises to be jaunty soon turns anodyne for an artist enjoying Top 20 US success. Sadly, rather formulaic Euro-pop from the Dutch-born singer."

Track listing

 12" single, UK (1996)
"Colour of Love" (Colourful Club Mix) – 6:07
"Colour of Love" (Berman 12" Mix) – 6:39
"Colour of Love" (Colour Of Bass Mix) – 6:59
"Colour of Love" (AJ Trenergy Hard Mix) – 7:08
"Colour of Love" (Colourful Radio Edit) – 4:08
"Colour of Love" (Pop Mix) – 3:30

 CD single, Europe & UK (1996)
"Colour of Love" (Colourful Radio Edit) – 3:36
"Colour of Love" (Pop Mix) – 3:30

 CD single, US (1996)
"Colour of Love" (Pop Mix) – 3:30
"Colour of Love" (Colourful Radio Edit) – 4:08

 CD maxi, US (1996)
"Colour of Love" (Berman 12" Mix) – 6:39
"Colour of Love" (Spike Club Mix) – 8:27
"Colour of Love" (Cibola Mix) – 7:00
"Colour of Love" (Original Edit) – 3:30
"Colour of Love" (Spike Dub Mix) – 7:40
"This Is Your Night" (Mousse T Remix) – 6:35

Charts

References

 

1996 singles
1996 songs
Amber (singer) songs
Eurodance songs
Tommy Boy Records singles